Cychrus spinicollis is a species of ground beetle in the subfamily of Carabinae. It was described by L. Dufour in 1857.

Distribution
This beetle is endemic to North-Western Spain.

References

spinicollis
Beetles described in 1857